Catostomus is a genus of fish belonging to the family Catostomidae, commonly known as suckers. Most members of the genus are native to North America, but C. catostomus is also found in Russia. Fish from different species of the genus are known to readily hybridize with each other.

Characteristics 
The members of this genus have nearly cylindrical bodies. They have large, horizontal mouths, and their lips are very much papillose. They have complete lateral lines. They have from 54 to 124 scales, seven to 17 dorsal rays, usually seven anal rays, and 20 to 44 thin, unbranched rakers on their first gill arches. Their gas bladders have two chambers.

The young of many of the species in the genus  have three dark grey blotches along their sides.

Species
Currently, 28 recognized species are in this genus:
 Catostomus ardens D. S. Jordan & C. H. Gilbert, 1881 (Utah sucker)
 Catostomus bernardini Girard, 1856 (Yaqui sucker)
 Catostomus bondi G. R. Smith, J. D. Stewart & N. E. Carpenter, 2013
 Catostomus cahita Siebert & W. L. Minckley, 1986 (Cahita sucker)
 Catostomus catostomus (J. R. Forster, 1773)
 Catostomus catostomus catostomus (J. R. Forster, 1773) (longnose sucker)
 †C. c. cristatus Cope, 1883
 C. c. lacustris Bajkov, 1927 (Jasper longnose sucker)
 Catostomus clarkii S. F. Baird & Girard, 1854 (desert sucker)
 Catostomus columbianus (C. H. Eigenmann & R. S. Eigenmann, 1893) (bridgelip sucker)
 Catostomus commersonii (Lacépède, 1803) (white sucker)
 Catostomus conchos Meek, 1902
 Catostomus discobolus (Cope, 1871)
 C. d. discobolus (Cope, 1871) (bluehead sucker)
 C. d. jarrovii (Cope, 1874) (Zuni bluehead sucker)
 Catostomus fumeiventris R. R. Miller, 1973 (Owens sucker)
 Catostomus insignis S. F. Baird & Girard, 1854 (Sonora sucker)
 Catostomus latipinnis S. F. Baird & Girard, 1853 (flannelmouth sucker)
 Catostomus leopoldi (Siebert & W. L. Minckley, 1986) (Bavispe sucker)
 Catostomus macrocheilus |Girard, 1856 (largescale sucker)
 Catostomus microps Rutter, 1908 (Modoc sucker)
 Catostomus nebuliferus Garman, 1881 (Nazas sucker)
 Catostomus occidentalis Ayres, 1854
 C. o. lacusanserinus Fowler, 1913 (Goose Lake sucker)
 C. o. mnioltiltus (Monterey sucker)
 C. o. occidentalis Ayres, 1854 (Sacramento sucker)
 Catostomus platyrhynchus (Cope, 1874) (Mountain sucker)
 Catostomus plebeius S. F. Baird & Girard, 1854 (Rio Grande sucker)
 Catostomus rimiculus C. H. Gilbert & Snyder, 1898 (Klamath smallscale sucker)
 Catostomus santaanae (Snyder, 1908) (Santa Ana sucker)
 Catostomus snyderi C. H. Gilbert, 1898 (Klamath largescale sucker)
 Catostomus tahoensis T. N. Gill & D. S. Jordan, 1878 (Tahoe sucker)
 Catostomus tsiltcoosensis Evermann & Meek, 1898
 Catostomus utawana F. W. Mather, 1886 (summer sucker)
 Catostomus warnerensis Snyder, 1908 (Warner sucker)
 Catostomus wigginsi Herre & Brock, 1936 (Opata sucker)

References 

 
Catostomidae